Standards is the tenth studio album by British soul and R&B singer-songwriter Seal. The album was released on 10 November 2017 by Decca Records and Virgin EMI Records.

Background
With the release of 7, Seal ended his recording contract with Warner Bros. Records. In an interview with Billboard in August 2017, Seal said he doesn't plan on releasing albums in the future: "The concept of going into a studio for however long and making a concept album, so to speak, I don't know if that's relevant these days or if indeed that is practical to do". He also added that he doesn't intend on signing with another major label.

In September 2017, Universal Music announced the release of Standards. Seal said of the album: "This is the album I have always wanted to make. I grew up listening to music from the Rat Pack era, so recording these timeless tunes was a lifelong dream. It was a true honour to collaborate with the same musicians who performed with Frank Sinatra and so many of my favourite artists, in the very same studios where the magic was first made – it was one of the greatest days of my recording career."

Track listing

Charts

Weekly charts

Year-end charts

References

2017 albums
Seal (musician) albums
Decca Records albums
Albums produced by Nick Patrick (record producer)
Albums recorded at Capitol Studios
Covers albums